Mills College Art Museum is a museum and art gallery in Oakland, California.

The originally all-girls' school Mills College was founded by Susan and Cyrus Mills, who were both interested in art and history. Susan's sister Jane Tolman was an art historian who developed the art history curriculum in 1875. With a Tolman Mills bequest the present museum building was constructed in 1925 called the Mills College Art Gallery. Albert M. Bender, the Mills College Trustee chiefly responsible for the museum's completion, also made a gift of 40 paintings and 75 prints by contemporary San Francisco Bay Area artists, and since then the gallery has become an important public collection of modern art in Northern California. Bender himself later became a principal founder of what is now the San Francisco Museum of Modern Art.

References

 Official website

Museums in Oakland, California
Modern art museums in the United States